Christian Darcy Bisson (born August 14, 1989) is a Canadian professional baseball second baseman in minor league baseball organization of the San Diego Padres of Major League Baseball. Prior to beginning his professional career, he played college baseball at the University of Kentucky. Bisson has also competed for the Canadian national baseball team.

Career
Bisson went to high school at École secondaire catholique Béatrice-Desloges. He attended the University of Kentucky, where he played college baseball for the Kentucky Wildcats baseball team in the Southeastern Conference (SEC) of the National Collegiate Athletic Association's (NCAA) Division I. Bisson filled in as a third baseman in 2008 due to injury, becoming the team's starting second baseman in 2009. Bisson was named to the All-SEC second team at second base in 2009 and 2010. In 2009, he played collegiate summer baseball with the Cotuit Kettleers of the Cape Cod Baseball League.

He was drafted by the San Diego Padres in the fourth round (124th overall) of the 2010 Major League Baseball Draft.  After signing with the Padres, Bisson made his professional debut with the Eugene Emeralds of the Class-A Short Season Northwest League, and played five games for the Arizona League Padres of the Rookie-level Arizona League. In 2011, Bisson was invited to a special mini-camp for prospects, and played for the Fort Wayne TinCaps of the Class-A Midwest League, Lake Elsinore Storms of California League and the San Antonio Missions ( AA ) of the Texas League.

Bisson played for the Canadian national baseball team. In 2011, he participated in the 2011 Baseball World Cup, winning the bronze medal, and the Pan American Games, winning the gold medal. Along with his teammates, Bisson was inducted into the Canadian Baseball Hall of Fame in 2012.

Due to recurring injury he retired in July 2013.

References

External links

1989 births
Living people
Arizona League Padres players
Baseball people from Ontario
Baseball players at the 2011 Pan American Games
Baseball second basemen
Canada national baseball team players
Canadian expatriate baseball players in the United States
Cotuit Kettleers players
Eugene Emeralds players
Fort Wayne TinCaps players
Lake Elsinore Storm players
Kentucky Wildcats baseball players
Sportspeople from Ottawa
Medalists at the 2011 Pan American Games
Pan American Games gold medalists for Canada
Pan American Games medalists in baseball